Børge Bach (20 January 1945 – 7 June 2016) was a Danish footballer who played for AaB and the national team, as a midfielder.

References

1945 births
2016 deaths
Danish men's footballers
Denmark international footballers
AaB Fodbold players
Association football midfielders